The Jama Masjid is a mosque located in Chitarpur town in Ramgarh district  in the Indian state of Jharkhand. It is one of the oldest mosques of the state built in late 16th century by Mughal rulers. The architecture of mosque is unique and built in Mughal architecture. The mosque hold prayer sessions every day.

References

Mosques in Jharkhand
Buildings and structures in Jharkhand
Religious buildings and structures completed in 1670